The 1992–93 season saw Leeds United A.F.C. compete in the inaugural season of the FA Premier League. As winners of the 1991–92 First Division title, they also competed in the UEFA Champions League.

Season summary
Despite finishing first the previous season, Leeds suffered something of a reversal this season: they were eliminated from the Champions League by Rangers and finished in 17th place in the Premier League. Although their home form was amongst the best in the Premier League – they lost only once at home, 4–1 to a Nottingham Forest side that finished the season last, and managed to put 5 goals past both Blackburn and Tottenham, both of whom finished in the top eight – a failure to win away from home all season cost Leeds dearly. As the season drew to a close Leeds were in danger of being only the second team to be relegated a season after winning the league title, but managed to secure safety with a few matches to spare, although they did finish only two points away from relegation.

Final league table

Results
Leeds United's score comes first

Legend

FA Premier League

Results by round

FA Charity Shield

FA Cup

League Cup

UEFA Champions League

Notes:

First-team squad

Left club during season

Statistics

Appearances and goals

|-
! colspan=16 style=background:#dcdcdc; text-align:center| Goalkeepers

|-
! colspan=16 style=background:#dcdcdc; text-align:center| Defenders

|-
! colspan=16 style=background:#dcdcdc; text-align:center| Midfielders

|-
! colspan=16 style=background:#dcdcdc; text-align:center| Forwards

|-
! colspan=16 style=background:#dcdcdc; text-align:center| Players transferred out during the season

Starting 11
Considering starts in all competitions
 GK:  John Lukic, 40
 RB:  Jon Newsome, 31
 CB:  Chris Fairclough, 30
 CB:  Chris Whyte, 35
 LB:  Tony Dorigo, 34
 RM:  Gordon Strachan, 25
 CM:  Gary McAllister, 33
 CM:  David Batty, 31
 LM:  Gary Speed, 40
 CF:  Lee Chapman, 37
 CF:  Rod Wallace, 32

Transfers and loans

Transfers in 

†Club record transfer fee at the time.

Transfers out 

Total spending:  £2,010,000

Loaned in

Loaned out

Notes

References

Leeds United F.C. seasons
Leeds United
Foot